Trinkets and Things is an album of duets by pianist Joanne Brackeen and guitarist Ryo Kawasaki recorded in 1978 and released on the Danish Timeless label.

Reception 

AllMusic reviewer Scott Yanow stated "Joane Brackeen has always been a powerful two-handed pianist. This program of duets with guitarist Ryo Kawasaki finds Brackeen utilizing her left hand in creative fashion, sometimes striding or playing basslines and occasionally implying rather than stating the time. Kawasaki also has plenty of stimulating solos on the set".

Track listing 
All compositions by Joanne Brackeen except where noted.

 "Trinkets and Things" (Ryo Kawasaki) – 5:08
 "Shadowbrook Air" – 5:58
 "Winnie and Woodstock" – 5:18
 "Fair Weather" – 4:42
 "Whim Within" – 6:36
 "Spring of Things" – 7:27
 "Haiti B" – 7:24

Personnel 
Joanne Brackeen – piano
Ryo Kawasaki – guitar

References 

Joanne Brackeen albums
1978 albums
Timeless Records albums